"Asleep" is a song by the English rock band the Smiths. It was released as a B-side to the single "The Boy with the Thorn in His Side" in September 1985, reaching No. 23 in the UK Singles Chart. It appears on the compilation albums The World Won't Listen and Louder Than Bombs, and on the deluxe edition of The Queen is Dead in 2017.

History
This song was only performed live once on 1 October 1985, at Eden Court in Inverness, on the final day of their 1985 Scotland tour.  It was only after a piano, that couldn't be moved off of the side of the stage, was discovered during soundcheck.  Apparently, Morrissey was in the middle of the stage, on the ground, in a fetal position by the end of the song.

Track listing

The original 12" and CD singles have "Rubber Ring" and "Asleep" segued into a continuous piece with the voice sample at the end of the former looped and faded into the wind noise preceding the latter. Described by Simon Goddard (in Songs That Saved Your Life, 2nd edition, p. 154) as a "spectacular combination" — a suggestion with which Johnny Marr concurs — this carefully executed sequence could only be found on the original 12" and CD singles, before the 2017 release of the remaster/re-issue of The Queen is Dead, which includes the same songs with the same segue as tracks 10 and 11 (respectively) of its "Additional Recordings" bonus disc. The two tracks are separated on all other compilations.

Charts

Reception

Jack Rabid of Allmusic describes "Asleep" as "lullaby-ish", and the entire single as "great ... just another feather in a jeweled cap".

In popular culture

 Although "Asleep" did not appear on the original The Queen Is Dead, it is referenced several times by the main character in Stephen Chbosky's 1999 novel The Perks of Being a Wallflower, and was also featured in the book's film adaptation. 
 "Asleep" appears as one of the tracks on the final mix CD in the 2005 novel As Simple As Snow by Gregory Galloway. 
 A version of "Asleep" is performed by Xiu Xiu, and appears on their 2003 acoustic compilation Fag Patrol. 
 In the 2011 film Sucker Punch, Emily Browning's character sings "Asleep".
"Asleep" is played in episode 3 (series 1) of the British TV series Sex Education, when the character Maeve is in a clinic ready to have an abortion.

References

The Smiths songs
1985 singles
Songs written by Morrissey
Songs written by Johnny Marr
1985 songs
Rough Trade Records singles
Songs about suicide
Songs about sleep